Continucare Corporation is a publicly traded medical care service company with 18 medical centers located in Florida, United States. Founded in 1996 in Miami, Florida, the company provides its service on an outpatient basis and offers medical management services for independent medical facilities as well as independent physician affiliates a group of physicians and healthcare professionals .
As of December 2006, the company has served about 40,000 patients. 
In 2011, the company was acquired Metropolitan Health Networks, Inc. at a cost of about $416 million.

References 

Companies established in 1996
2011 mergers and acquisitions